Paula Xinis (born Panagiota Xinis, 1968) is a United States district judge of the United States District Court for the District of Maryland.

Biography

Xinis is of Greek ancestry.  She received a Bachelor of Arts degree, summa cum laude, in 1991 from the University of Virginia. She received a Juris Doctor in 1997 from Yale Law School. She began her legal career as a law clerk for Judge Diana Gribbon Motz of the United States Court of Appeals for the Fourth Circuit, from 1997 to 1998. From 1998 to 2011, she served as an Assistant Federal Public Defender, serving as Director of Training for the office, 2006 to 2011. She served at the law firm of Murphy, Falcon & Murphy in Baltimore, Maryland, as a senior trial attorney from 2011 and as a partner from 2013 to 2016. She practiced both civil and criminal litigation.

Federal judicial service

On March 26, 2015, President Barack Obama nominated Xinis to serve as a United States District Judge of the United States District Court for the District of Maryland, to the seat vacated by Judge Deborah K. Chasanow, who assumed senior status on October 3, 2014. Her nomination was reported from the Senate Judiciary Committee on September 17, 2015, by a voice vote. On May 16, 2016 the Senate confirmed her nomination by a 53–34 vote. She received her judicial commission on May 18, 2016.

References

External links

1968 births
Living people
American women lawyers
Judges of the United States District Court for the District of Maryland
People from Mineola, New York
United States district court judges appointed by Barack Obama
21st-century American judges
University of Virginia alumni
Yale Law School alumni
Public defenders
21st-century American women judges